Anomalies, published in 1997 by Imperium Games, is an anthology of nine adventures for the science fiction role-playing game Traveller.

Description
Anomlaies is a 112-page softcover book, with design by Marc Miller, editing by Tony Lee and cover art by Chris Foss.

Plot summary
Anomalies includes nine loosely linked adventures that use the Traveller universe and rules system, including:
 "Lock and Loot": the players try to prevent a renegade diplomat from enslaving a primitive civilization.
 "The Sleepers" is set in a cyrogenics facility, and features followers of a death cult and deadly robots.
 "Dead Space": the players confront a genetic experiment on a deserted research station.

Reception
In the January 1998 edition of Dragon (Issue #243), Rick Swan called the collection "a triumph, one of the best sci-fi anthologies I’ve ever come across. Brilliantly staged, featuring compelling characters and jaw-dropping plot twists, every episode is a winner, and I'd be hard-pressed to pick my favorite." Swan did criticize the maps, which he found "bland"; he called the artwork "so-so"; and he found the "pages of dense text are hard on the eyes." But he concluded by giving the book a top rating of 6 out of 6, saying, "Nitpicks aside, Anomalies is a first-rate effort, absorbing, intelligent roleplaying of the highest caliber."

References

Role-playing game supplements introduced in 1997
Traveller (role-playing game) adventures